is a Japanese photography magazine, published between 1950 and 2021.

Nippon Camera started in March 1950 as a bimonthly magazine, published by Kōgeisha (Tokyo) as the successor to the book series Amachua Shashin Sōsho (1948–49). It became a monthly magazine from July 1951.

The magazine is now (2020) published (in Tokyo) by Nippon Camera-sha, which has also published an annual, Shashin Nenkan and other photography-related books.

Since the demise of Camera Mainichi, the sole rival of Nippon Camera as a photography magazine attempting to cater to all interests was Asahi Camera, but this too was discontinued in summer 2020.

In April 2021 the magazine announced that it will suspend its publication after the May 2021 issue.

Notes

External links
 Nippon Camera-sha, with a prominent link to Nippon Camera
One dealer's page for the magazine

1950 establishments in Japan
2021 disestablishments in Japan
Monthly magazines published in Japan
Photography magazines published in Japan
Magazines established in 1950
Magazines disestablished in 2021
Magazines published in Tokyo
Bi-monthly magazines